Cecil Graham is a former Australian Rules football player. Graham played for Central District Football Club in the South Australian National Football League. Graham was a member of the 1983 Indigenous All-Stars team.
He is the father-in-law of former Collingwood and current Perth Football Club player Leon Davis.

References

Living people
Year of birth missing (living people)
Central District Football Club players
Indigenous Australian players of Australian rules football